CompuMe is a chain of computer stores based in the Middle East. It currently has branches in the United Arab Emirates and Egypt. It used to be a part of the Landmark group till it was bought out by Delta Communications and trade.

It sells computers, laptops, mobile phones, televisions, printers, imaging equipment, software, hard drives, USB Flash drives, and audio equipment. Many branches have an in-store upgrade section for upgrading laptops and desktops, as well as "PC Klinic"s for computer repairs.

References

External links
Compume Computer Repairs Club

Retail companies of the United Arab Emirates